Ohama may refer to:

 Ohama, a former branch line of the Hankai Tramway
 Ōhama-class target ship, a bombing target ship class of the Imperial Japanese Navy serving during World War II
 People with the surname Ohama or Ōhama
 Fumitaro Ohama (born 1971), Japanese internet entrepreneur and philanthropist
 Kendra Ohama (born 1965), Canadian retired wheelchair basketball player
 Linda Ohama, Canadian filmmaker and artist
 Ohama Kagetaka (1540–1597), pirate and naval general
 Takako Ohama (Rei Igarashi, born 1963), Japanese actress
 Yasushi Ōhama, Japanese actor known professionally as known professionally as Show Hayami

See also
 Ōhama Domain, a Japanese domain of the Edo period, associated with Shinano Province in modern-day Nagano Prefecture
 Words written with the same kanji (小浜), as "Ohama":
 Obama (disambiguation)
 Kohama (disambiguation)
Omaha (disambiguation)